Paranaense may refer to:

Campeonato Paranaense, Brazilian association football league
Clube Atlético Paranaense, Brazilian association football club
Paranaense F.C., a Paraguayan association football club
Sport Club Corinthians Paranaense, Brazilian association football club